Selma Epstein (August 14, 1927 – November 21, 2014) was an American concert pianist, teacher, and champion of contemporary music by women and African Americans.

Biography 
Born August 14, 1927 in Brooklyn, New York to Tillie (Schneider) and Samuel Schechtman, Selma excelled in mathematics at school, but pursued her love of music.

Career 
She performed at 15 at Carnegie Hall and went on to attend the Juilliard School in New York City. There she became the youngest student of famed Ukrainian-born pianist Rosina Lhévinne. Selma moved on to gain the D. Hendrick Ezerman Foundation Scholarship at the Philadelphia Conservatory of Music in Philadelphia and studied with Eduard Steuermann there. 

Selma married fellow concert pianist Joseph Epstein in 1950.

In the 1960’s she was invited to be the first pianist to present a series of all contemporary pieces in the Far East and founded the Baltimore Washington Contemporary Music Group. In addition to her performances and teaching duties, she gave private lessons.

As a concert pianist, Selma Epstein toured Europe and North America many times in addition to "two very successful tours in Australia. During her second tour, she was invited to teach at the New South Wales Conservatorium of Music. From 1972 to 1975 Epstein was a resident recording artist for the Australian Broadcasting Company, where she recorded several unpublished works of Australian-born composer Percy Grainger."

Hailed as a pioneer and champion of contemporary music, she was applauded for her robust efforts to promote black and female composers from the 20th century. In all, she toured the world for many decades to bring attention to that music.

Later years 
A visual artist, Epstein liked to draw using charcoal, pastels and paints.

She died at 87 on November 21, 2014 at her home in Pflugerville, Texas, and was buried in Central Texas State Veterans Cemetery, Killeen, Texas.

Archives 

In 2002, Epstein gifted a large collection of memorabilia, music and recordings to the Library Congress, where it is held as the "Selma Epstein Collection, 1931–1987." The five-box collection includes scores, art music, chamber music, concerti grossi, songs, albums (books), concert programs, promotional materials, manuscripts and clippings (information artifacts). An inventory of her recorded material can be found in the Music Division's collection file.

Selected publications 

 Epstein, S. (1990). A Guide for Researching Music by Women Composers. Chromattica USA. (book)
 Epstein, S. (1994). Composer Interview: Ruth Schonthal, Journal of the IAWM (International Alliance for Women in Music), February 1994, pp. 5–8.

References

External links 
 Recording by Selma Epstein 

   

1927 births
2014 deaths
People from Brooklyn
American pianists
20th-century American pianists
20th-century women musicians
20th-century American women pianists
20th-century American women musicians
Juilliard School alumni